Naogaon is a city and district headquarter of Naogaon District in northern Bangladesh. It is located in the bank of Mini Jamuna river. It is the centre of commerce within the Naogaon District. The municipality consists of 9 wards and 56 mahallas.

Administration
Naogaon subdivision, under Rajshahi zilla, was established in 1877 and was turned into a zilla in 1984. The zila consists of 11 upazilas, 99 unions, 2565 mauzas, 2854 villages, 3 municipalities, 27 wards and 76 mahallas. The upazilas are NAOGAON SADAR, ATRAI, BADALGACHHI, DHAMOIRHAT, MANDA, MAHADEBPUR, NIAMATPUR, Patnitala Upazila, PORSHA, RANINAGAR and SAPAHAR.
Background, Geographic Area and Location: Naogaon was one of the sub-divisions of former Rajshahi zilla. It was upgraded to zila on 1 March 1984. It is believed that the present zilla headquarters initially developed in a mauza comprising nine (meaning ‘Nao’ in Bengali) villages (meaning ‘Gaon’ in Bengali). The zilla is bounded on the north by India, on the east by Joypurhat and Bogra zilas, on the south by Natore and Rajshahi zilas and on the west by Nawabganj and India. The total area of the zila is 3435.65 km2. (1326.00 sq.miles) of which 9.09 km2. (3.51 sq. miles) is riverine and 19.45 km2 (7.51 sq. miles) is under forest. The zila lies between 24° 32′ and 25° 13′ north latitudes and between 28° 23′ and 89° 10′ east longitudes.

Annual average temperature
Maximum 37.8 °C and minimum 11.2 °C; annual rainfall 1862 mm.

Main rivers
Small Jamuna, Tulsi Ganga, Atrai

History
Indigo rebellion (1859–62); peasant revolt against the Zamindar in protest of increasing land revenue (1883).

Marks of War of Liberation
Mass grave 9; mass killing site 7, memorial sculpture 1, monument 1.

Ethnic national
Mainly Santal, Oraon, Mahali, Munda and others. Among them Oraon are the mojor in population.

Main crops
Paddy, potato, watermelon, maize, balsam apple, cucumber, oil seeds, and pulses. Extinct or nearly extinct crops include opium, indigo, aman and aus paddy, tobacco, vetch, and cannabis.

Fruit production
Mango, jackfruit, banana, guava, palm, plum, papaya, peanut, wood apple, litchi, and coconut.

Transport
Palanquin, horse carriage, bullock cart, and buffalo cart. These means of transport are either extinct or nearly extinct.

References

Populated places in Rajshahi Division
Municipalities in Naogaon District